Alvin Evans (October 4, 1845 – June 19, 1906) was an American lawyer and Republican member of the U.S. House of Representatives from Pennsylvania.

Early life and education 
Born in Ebensburg, Pennsylvania on October 4, 1845, Evans was a son of David J. and Jane Ann (Jones) Evans and a grandson of John Evans, a carpenter and a native of Cardiganshire, Wales. Educated in local public schools and the Iron City Business College in Pittsburgh, Pennsylvania, Alvin Evins obtained a job in lumbering at the age of sixteen when his father's business failed due to the financial crash of 1857.

Career

American Civil War 
In 1862, Alvin Evans enlisted with a volunteer military unit, which was mobilized in response to the potential invasion of Pennsylvania by the Confederate States Army during the American Civil War.

Legal and political career 
After beginning legal studies with George M. Reade of Ebensburg in 1870, he was admitted to the bar in 1873. He then established a law practice in Ebensburg, and later advocated for clients in the Superior Court of Pennsylvania and the Supreme Court of Pennsylvania, as well as in federal court. A one-term burgess for the borough of Ebensburg, he also worked as solicitor for the Pennsylvania Railroad in Cambria County, Pennsylvania, and was a member of the school board and city council of Ebensburg. Involved in the incorporation of the First National Bank of Ebensburg, he was later appointed as president of that bank's board of directors.

Elected as a Republican to the Fifty-seventh and Fifty-eighth Congresses, he did not seek renomination in 1904, but instead returned to the practice of law.

A member of the board of trustees of the First Congregational Church of Ebensburg, he was also active in the Grand Army of the Republic's Captain John M. Jones Post and the Free and Accepted Masons' Summit Lodge, No. 312.

Personal life 
He wed Kate Shryock (1846–1886) in Wilmore, Pennsylvania on November 17, 1875. They had three children. Evans died in Ebensburg, and was interred in the Lloyd Cemetery.

References

1845 births
1906 deaths
People from Ebensburg, Pennsylvania
American people of Welsh descent
Pennsylvania lawyers
Politicians from Pittsburgh
American bankers
Union Army soldiers
People of Pennsylvania in the American Civil War
Republican Party members of the United States House of Representatives from Pennsylvania
19th-century American politicians
19th-century American businesspeople